.is (dot is) is the top-level domain for Iceland. The country code is derived from the first two letters of Ísland, which is the Icelandic word for Iceland. Registration of .is domains is open to all people and companies without any special restriction.

The first .is domain, hi.is, is the domain of Háskóli Íslands (University of Iceland). It was registered on December 11, 1986, making it one of the earliest ever domain registrations on the Internet.

According to McAfee report "Mapping the Mal Web," .is was evaluated as one of the top 10 most secure TLDs in the world in the years 2007, 2008, 2009, and 2010. No report has come out since then. , there were just over 86,000 .is domains registered.

, .is domains can be registered for up to five years.

Domain suspensions
In April 2013, ISNIC briefly hosted The Pirate Bay's domain ThePirateBay.is.

In 2014, ISNIC suspended two domains which hosted material produced by the Islamic State, including Khilafah.is.

In September 2017, ISNIC briefly hosted American neo-Nazi domain dailystormer.is, which had been removed by several domain Registries around the world. It was pulled from its .is domain after its publisher did not fulfill the standard procedure of disclosing his address.

In September 2022, ISNIC suspended the .is domain for Kiwi Farms, a controversial internet trolling and harassment forum.

Domain hacks
Many domain hacks exist which use the .is suffix as the English verb is.

References

External links
 IANA .is whois information
 .is domain registration website

1986 establishments in Iceland
Internet properties established in 1986
Country code top-level domains
Telecommunications in Iceland
Internet in Iceland
Council of European National Top Level Domain Registries members
Computer-related introductions in 1986